Römer is a lunar impact crater that is located to the north of the Sinus Amoris in the northeast section of the Moon. It was named after Danish astronomer Ole Rømer. It lies in the southwestern part of the mountainous region named the Montes Taurus. It was unofficially named as Atatürk by astronomer Hugh Percy Wilkins in his lunar map, possibly due to the fact that the Montes Taurus (or Toros Dağları in Turkish) are located in Turkey. To the west-northwest is the crater-bay Le Monnier, on the eastern edge of Mare Serenitatis.

The rim of Römer has relatively high walls with a terraced inner surface. There is a small craterlet on the north part of the floor, and a large central peak at the midpoint.  Römer has a ray system, and due to these rays, it is mapped as part of the Copernican System.

To the northwest of the crater is a prominent system of rilles named the Rimae Römer. These follow a course to the north from the western rim of the crater, and have a combined length of about 110 kilometres.

Satellite craters
By convention these features are identified on lunar maps by placing the letter on the side of the crater midpoint that is closest to Römer.

The following craters have been renamed by the IAU.
 Römer K — See Franck (crater).
 Römer L — See Brewster (crater).

References

 
 
 
 
 
 
 
 
 
 
 

Impact craters on the Moon